Australian mobile intensive care ambulances (MICA) are well-equipped ambulances staffed by highly trained paramedics dispatched to emergency situations where patients require a higher level of care than a regular ambulance can provide.

MICA paramedics 

MICA paramedics are extremely highly trained and experienced medical professionals. As with all Australian paramedics they hold either an advanced diploma of health science (paramedic) (which can be converted to a degree level by off-campus studies), or other recognised bachelor's degree, and then do extra study to the MICA level.

MICA paramedics must also complete a graduate diploma in emergency healthcare. This requires concurrent employment with ambulance services in a clinical role and at least two years post-qualification experience as a paramedic in the service. While also working as a paramedic the student must complete a year’s worth of course work on advance emergency health. Paramedics may also choose to complete a Masters in Emergency Health (paramedic). However, this focuses more on research, emergency services management and community health rather than frontline clinical care.

Working as a paramedic, whether it be MICA or ALS (advanced life support), can be extremely emotionally taxing.

Equipment 

During the course of a day's work, paramedics will go through a lot of medical supplies to treat a variety of injuries and illnesses. Standard equipment that paramedics use include:

 Defibrillator / monitor with non-invasive monitoring and 12-lead telemetry
 Oxygen therapy - re-breathing circuit
 Advanced airway management set
 Suction kit
 Spinal collars 
 Spine board 
 Inflatable splints 
 Collapsible wheelchair 
 Medical kits 
 Drugs
 Blood pressure cuff (sphygmometer)
 Pulse oximeter
 Scoop stretcher

MICA paramedics may also use:

 Capnograph
 Pneumocath
 Intraosseous kit
 Advanced drugs including inotropes, antiarrhythmics, sedatives and neuromuscular blockers
 Syringe pumps
 Cold intravenous fluids to induce hypothermia

Vehicles 

MICA paramedics crew a range of vehicles depending on their mission.

Ambulance Victoria 

In Victoria, MICA Paramedic teams are equipped with modified versions of the Mercedes Benz Sprinter. In the metropolitan area of Melbourne, the changes from the models used by advanced life support (ALS) paramedic Team are to accommodate equipment unique to MICA. In Regional Victoria, the same Mercedes Sprinter is used whether it be as a MICA or an ALS vehicle. Often an ALS and a MICA paramedic work as a rostered crew (PRU).

In addition to 2-paramedic crew MICA ambulance, a number of MICA single responder units (SRU) are located within central metropolitan areas and regional areas. MICA single responders are equipped with a range of vehicles including Holden Adventra 4WD wagons and Ford Territory vehicles.

In rural and regional settings, time sensitive patients are treated and transported either by advanced life support paramedics (ALS) and/or mobile intensive care paramedics with support by helicopter based MICA paramedics. MICA paramedics often are requested to support ALS paramedics when dealing with a sick patient as a 'back-up' crew.

CSO (Clinical Support Officer), who provide additional support to ALS crews, are also often MICA trained.

Ambulance Services New South Wales 

In addition to the primary response vehicles above, the NSW Service also operates specialised vehicles that have been designed to meet geographical and operational requirements, including:

Rescue trucks Ambulance rescue vehicles are equipped with a vast array of equipment including motorised hydraulic tools, air tools, hand held global positioning satellite units, fibre optic search scopes, portable atmospheric testing units, lighting and breathing apparatus.

Rapid response vehicles Seven Subaru Forrester AWD vehicles and two BMW motorbikes make up the current rapid response fleet. All vehicles have distinctive signage, high visibility warning lights and sirens. Subaru Forresters are also equipped with an advanced satellite navigation system.
 
Over-snow vehicles Its fleet of vehicles at Perisher Valley Station include a Haaglund all-terrain vehicle, a Kassborher oversnow vehicle, two Yamaha snowmobiles, a 4WD Quad Bike and trailer and a 4WD Mercedes.
 
Mega lift trucks These multi-purpose vehicles are used for a range of incidents including chemical, biological and radiological (CBR) incidents.

Command and communications vehicle This vehicle serves as a mobile command post for the management of incidents and major planned events. Wirelessly connected to the ambulance wide area network it offers video conferencing, SmartBoard and voice communications. The vehicle also provides remote dispatching capability with the system connected in real time to the central computer aided dispatching system.

References 

https://web.archive.org/web/20070428083614/http://www.ambulance.nsw.gov.au/what/fleet.html

http://www.ambulance.vic.gov.au/

MOBILE INTENSIVE CARE AMBULANCE A SERVICE IN CRISIS Report on results of MICA Survey 2006. A report Prepared by Ambulance Employees Australia - Victoria

Emergency medical services in Australia